Football Delhi (formerly Delhi Soccer Association) is one of the 37 Indian state football associations that are affiliated to the All India Football Federation. It is the state-level governing body of football-related sports in Delhi, India. The Delhi football team is also administered by Football Delhi.

Competitions

Men's 
Football Delhi organises Delhi Football League as ladder-based competition, of which Delhi Premier League is the highest state-level competition. Delhi Premier League operates on promotion-relegation with FD Senior Division League. A-Division operates on promotion-relegation with FD B-Division, which operates likewise with FD C-Division.

Women's 
 FD Women's Premier League
 FD Women's Championship

Futsal 
 FD Futsal League
 FD Futsal League (Women's)

Youth 
 Delhi Youth League (U-13, U-15, U-18)

See also 
Football in India
Indian football league system
I-League
I-League Second Division
Santosh Trophy
Durand Cup
Futsal Club Championship
Indian Women's League

References

Football governing bodies in India
Football in Delhi
Organisations based in Delhi